Thomas Olde Heuvelt (born 16 April 1983) is a Dutch horror writer. His short stories have received the Hugo Award for Best Novelette, the Dutch Paul Harland Prize, and have been nominated for two additional Hugo Awards and a World Fantasy Award.

Early life and influences
Olde Heuvelt was born in Nijmegen, Netherlands. He studied English and American literature at the Radboud Universiteit Nijmegen and at the University of Ottawa in Canada, where he lived for half a year. In many interviews, he recalls that the  literary heroes of his childhood were Roald Dahl and Stephen King, who created in him a love for grim and dark fiction. He later discovered the works of a wider range of contemporary writers such as Jonathan Safran Foer, Carlos Ruiz Zafón, Neil Gaiman, and Yann Martel, whom he calls his greatest influences.

Career
Olde Heuvelt wrote his debut novel, De Onvoorziene, at the age of nineteen. It was published with a small printing in 2002 and followed in 2004 by PhantasAmnesia, a 600-page novel in which the author combined horror with humor and satire. Since 2008, his novels have been published by major Dutch publishing house Luitingh-Sijthoff.

Olde Heuvelt is a multiple winner of the Paul Harland Prize for best Dutch work of fantastic fiction (2009 and 2012). Translated into English, his short story "The Boy Who Cast No Shadow", published by PS Publishing in the UK, was nominated for the Science Fiction & Fantasy Translation Awards in 2012. The same story was nominated for the Hugo Award for Best Novelette in 2013.

In April 2013, Tor Books released his story "The Ink Readers of Doi Saket" as an e-book. It would be nominated for the Hugo Award for Best Short Story and the World Fantasy Award in 2014.

Olde Heuvelt's story "The Day the World Turned Upside Down", published in Lightspeed Magazine, won the Hugo Award for Best Novelette in 2015.

In 2016, Olde Heuvelt's worldwide debut novel HEX was published in the US by Tor Books and in the UK and Australia by Hodder and Stoughton. Horror novelist Stephen King tweeted about the book, calling it "totally, brilliantly original". The publication was followed by a six-week book tour through the US.

Heuvelt's newest English-language book, Echo, was published by Tor Books in February 2022. His latest Dutch work is  Orakel.

Honors
 2005 Paul Harland Prize (Debut Prize) for De kronieken van een weduwnaar
 2009 Paul Harland Prize (Winner) for The Boy Who Cast No Shadow (Dutch version)
 2012 Paul Harland Prize (Winner) for Fishbowl Universe (Dutch version)
 2012 Science Fiction & Fantasy Translation Awards (Honorable Mention, together with Carlos Ruiz Zafón) for The Boy Who Cast No Shadow (US)
 2013 Hugo Award (Nomination) for The Boy Who Cast No Shadow
 2014   Hugo Award (Nomination) for The Ink Readers of Doi Saket
 2014   World Fantasy Award (Nomination) for The Ink Readers of Doi Saket
 2015   Hugo Award (winner) for "The Day the World Turned Upside Down"

Bibliography

Novels
 De Onvoorziene (Intes International) (2002)
 PhantasAmnesia (Intes International) (2004)
 Leerling Tovenaar Vader & Zoon (Luitingh-Sijthoff) (2008)
 Harten Sara (Luitingh-Sijthoff) (2011)
 HEX (Hodder & Stoughton, UK; Tor Books, US) (2016)
 Echo (Luitingh-Sijthoff) (2019)

Short story collections
 Om nooit te vergeten (Luitingh-Sijthoff) (2017)

Short stories
 "De Bank en het sterrenlicht" (2006)
 "De Koperen Krokodil" (2006)
 "Tulpen en windmolens in het Land van de Champignons" (2006)
 "De Kronieken van een Weduwnaar" (2008)
 "Harlequin on Dam Square" (Oxygen Books, UK) (2010)
 "Alles van Waarde is Weerloos" (2010)
 "Balora met het grote hoofd" (2012)
 "The Boy Who Cast No Shadow" (PS Publishing, UK) (2012)
 "The Ink Readers of Doi Saket" (Tor Books, US) (2013)
 "The Day the World Turned Upside Down" (Lightspeed Magazine, US; 2014)
 "Hertenhart en Gembertimbaaltjes" (2017)
 "You Know How the Story Goes" (Tor Books) (2017)
 "Dolores Dolly Poppedijn" (Collectieve Propaganda van het Nederlandse Boek) (2019)

References

External links
 
 "The Boy Who Cast No Shadow" at PS Publishing
 Author page, "The Ink Readers of Doi Saket" at Macmillan

Living people
1983 births
Horror writers
Magic realism writers
Dutch fantasy writers
Hugo Award-winning writers
21st-century Dutch novelists
Dutch male short story writers
Dutch male novelists
21st-century Dutch short story writers
21st-century Dutch male writers